The Concepción Chile Temple is a temple of the Church of Jesus Christ of Latter-day Saints (LDS Church) in Concepción, Chile.

History
The intent to construct the temple was announced by church president Thomas S. Monson on October 3, 2009, during the church's semi-annual general conference.  The temple was announced concurrently with the Brigham City Utah, Fort Lauderdale Florida, Fortaleza Brazil and Sapporo Japan temples; at the time, the announcement brought the total number of temples worldwide to 151.  It is the second temple constructed in Chile, along with the Santiago Chile Temple which was dedicated in 1983.

On October 17, 2015, Walter F. González presided at a groundbreaking to signify beginning of construction. Following construction, a public open house was held from September 15 through October 13, 2018, excluding Sundays. The temple was dedicated on October 28, 2018 by Russell M. Nelson.

In 2020, the Concepción Chile Temple was closed temporarily during the year in response to the coronavirus pandemic.

See also

 Comparison of temples of The Church of Jesus Christ of Latter-day Saints
 List of temples of The Church of Jesus Christ of Latter-day Saints
 List of temples of The Church of Jesus Christ of Latter-day Saints by geographic region
 Temple architecture (Latter-day Saints)
 The Church of Jesus Christ of Latter-day Saints in Chile

References

External links
Concepción Chile Temple Official site
Concepción Chile Temple at ChurchofJesusChristTemples.org

Buildings and structures in Biobío Region
Temples (LDS Church) in Latin America
Temples (LDS Church) in Chile
The Church of Jesus Christ of Latter-day Saints in Chile
21st-century Latter Day Saint temples
Religious buildings and structures completed in 2018